Leskovec may refer to:

Croatia 
Leskovec, Croatia, a village in the Municipality of Štrigova

Czech Republic 
Leskovec nad Moravicí, a village in the Moravian-Silesian Region
Leskovec (Vsetín District), a village in the Zlín Region

Slovenia 
Leskovec, Celje, a village in the City Municipality of Celje
Leskovec, Ivančna Gorica, a village in the Municipality of Ivančna Gorica
Leskovec, Novo Mesto, a village in the City Municipality of Novo Mesto
Leskovec pri Krškem, a village in the Municipality of Krško

Kosovo 
 Leskovec, Kosovo, a village in Prizren Municipality

See also 
 Leskovac
 Lyaskovets
 Leskovica